Kazi M Badruddoza (born 1 January 1927) is a National Emeritus Scientist working for the National Agricultural Research System of Bangladesh.

Education and career
He completed his B.Sc.Ag (Hons) from the University of Dhaka in 1952 and later received his Ph.D. from Louisiana State University.

Among different posts, Badruddoza was director general for the Pakistan Agricultural Research Council. He was also chief research adviser for FAU/UNDP, Hanoi (1985–88). and president (2012–13) of the Bangladesh Academy of Agriculture (BAAG). Badruddoza discovered a variety of guava called Kazipayara after his name. He was a member of the syndicate of the Bangladesh Agricultural University during 1974–1988.

Awards
 Independence Day Award (2012)
 The fungal genus Kaziboletus is named after him.

References

1927 births
Living people
University of Dhaka alumni
Louisiana State University alumni
Recipients of the Independence Day Award
Fellows of Bangladesh Academy of Sciences
Bangladeshi scientists
Bangladeshi expatriates in the United States